The women's pole vault event at the 2004 African Championships in Athletics was held in Brazzaville, Republic of the Congo on July 15.

Results

References
Results

2004 African Championships in Athletics
Pole vault at the African Championships in Athletics
2004 in women's athletics